Strana la vita, internationally released as The Strangeness of Life, is a 1987 Italian comedy-drama film directed by Giuseppe Bertolucci. It is based on a novel by Giovanni Pascutto.

Cast 
 Diego Abatantuono: Dario 
 Monica Guerritore: Anna 
 Domiziana Giordano: Silvia
 Amanda Sandrelli: Ester 
 Massimo Venturiello: Mario 
 Lina Sastri: Nora
 Felice Andreasi: father of Nora
 Maria Monti: mother of Anna
 Nick Novecento: Giacomino
 Anita Laurenzi: mother of Nora
 Claudio Bisio: a patient

References

External links

1987 films
1987 comedy-drama films
Films directed by Giuseppe Bertolucci
Italian comedy-drama films
Films scored by Nicola Piovani
1980s Italian films
1980s Italian-language films